Plagiosiphon longitubus is a species of plant in the family Fabaceae. It is found in Cameroon. Its natural habitat is subtropical or tropical dry forests. It is threatened by habitat loss.

References

Detarioideae
Flora of Cameroon
Critically endangered plants
Taxonomy articles created by Polbot